Elmer the Great Dane is a Walter Lantz character in the Oswald the Lucky Rabbit cartoon series, who premiered in the 1935 short Elmer the Great Dane. The character's name is most likely a reference to Elmer, the Great, a 1933 film.

Concept
When Universal's then biggest cartoon star Oswald the Lucky Rabbit was declining in popularity, Lantz decided to come up with new characters to keep the shorts running. One of these characters was a great dane which they named Elmer, and was cast as Oswald's pet dog. The inspiration for character came from the fact that Lantz was a fanatic in great danes.

Career on screen

Black-and-white period
Elmer made his screen debut in Elmer the Great Dane (1935) and was originally the pet dog of Oswald, back when the rabbit was still black-furred. Although Oswald was drastically remodelled into an all-white character that year, Elmer was not changed in any way. Two years later, he was joined by Doxie Dachsund who also became Oswald's dog.

Elmer, along with Doxie, made his last regular appearance in Soup to Mutts (1939).

Guest appearances in the colored period
Viewers probably thought Elmer was history when he left the screen in 1939 and that his owner followed in 1943. But a strange twist took place only fourteen years later.

Elmer was pulled out of retirement and made a guest appearance in Wrestling Wrecks (1953). There, he was recast as the dog of Woody Woodpecker.

Selected appearances
"Elmer The Great Dane" (04/29/1935)
"The Quail Hunt" (09/23/1935)
"Monkey Wretches" (09/23/1935)
"Doctor Oswald" (12/30/1935) - later reissued as "Dr. Oswald"
"Alaska Sweepstakes" (02/17/1936)
"Fun House" (05/04/1936)
"Music Hath Charms" (09/07/1936)
"Beach Combers" (10/5/1936)
"Gopher Trouble" (11/30/1936)
"Duck Hunt" (03/08/1937)
"The Birthday Party" (03/29/1937)
"The Wily Weasel" (06/07/1937)
"The Playful Pup" (07/12/1937)
"Firemen's Picnic" (08/16/1937) - cameo only
"Feed the Kitty" (03/14/1938)
"Tail End" (04/25/1938)
"Problem Child" (05/16/1938)
"Soup To Mutts" (01/09/1939)
"Wrestling Wrecks" (07/20/1953)

See also
List of Walter Lantz cartoons
List of Walter Lantz cartoon characters

References

External links

The Walter Lantz-o-Pedia

Film characters introduced in 1935
Fictional dogs
Universal Pictures cartoons and characters
Walter Lantz Productions cartoons and characters